The Football League play-offs for the 1995–96 season were held in May 1996, with the finals taking place at Wembley Stadium in London. The play-off semi-finals were played over two legs and were contested by the teams who finished in 3rd, 4th, 5th and 6th place in the Football League First Division and Football League Second Division and the 4th, 5th, 6th and 7th placed teams in the Football League Third Division table. The winners of the semi-finals progressed through to the finals, with the winner of these matches gaining promotion for the following season.

Background
The Football League play-offs have been held every year since 1987. They take place for each division following the conclusion of the regular season and are contested by the four clubs finishing below the automatic promotion places.

First Division

Semi-finals
First leg

Second leg

Crystal Palace won 3–1 on aggregate.

Leicester City won 1–0 on aggregate.

Final

Second Division

Semi-finals
First leg

Second leg

Bradford City won 3–2 on aggregate.

Notts County won 3–2 on aggregate.

Final

Third Division

Semi-finals
First leg

Second leg

Plymouth Argyle won 3–2 on aggregate.

Darlington won 4–2 on aggregate.

Final

External links
Football League website

 
English Football League play-offs